A web archive file is an archive file that contains the entire content of a web page; some file formats can store more than one web page, such as the Mozilla Archive Format. A single web page can contain several resources such as images, animations, scripts, audio, video, etc.,  all of which are stored in the web archive file format used. Web archive formats include , .maff, and .webarchive.

References

 
Archive formats